John Dobson is a South African rugby union coach, currently the head coach of Super rugby side .

Career

Playing career

He also had spells in Italy at Valpolicella Rugby Club and Portugal.

UCT Ikey Tigers / Roma

Dobson was appointed as the technical director of Italian National Championship of Excellence side Roma for the 2009–10 season. He was due to coach new Italian franchise Praetorians Roma in the 2010–11 Celtic League, but their inclusion in the European competition never materialised, with Benetton Treviso being included instead. He returned to South Africa to guide UCT Ikey Tigers the final of the 2010 Varsity Cup, where a repeat of the 2008 final also saw the same result, with Maties winning their third title in succession.

Western Province Under-21 / Vodacom Cup

In 2010, Dobson was appointed as the coach of the  side and he helped them win the 2010 Under-21 Provincial Championship in his first season in charge, as they beat the s 43–32 in the final in Durban. He returned as a technical adviser to his former assistant Kevin Foote for the UCT Ikey Tigers' 2011 Varsity Cup campaign, which they won for the first time, beating  26–16 in the final.

In the second half of the season, his Western Province Under-21 side reached the semi-final of the 2011 Under-21 Provincial Championship, but Dobson lost out to the same opposition, with the s winning the match 19–12.

Western Province won the Vodacom Cup under Dobson's tutelage for the first and only time in 2012, beating five-time champions  20–18 in Kimberley. Dobson reached another final with the Under-21 side, but they fell short in the 2012 Under-21 Provincial Championship, losing 13–22 to the s.

An exit in the quarter final stage of the 2014 Vodacom Cup (losing 8–13 to the ) was followed by a run to the finals for the Under-21s; however, they failed to defend their title, losing 10–20 to the s.

Dobson once again guided Western Province to the final of the Vodacom Cup in 2015, but were defeated 7–24 by the  who won their first Vodacom Cup title.

In total, Dobson guided Western Province to the Vodacom Cup play-offs for five consecutive years between 2011 and 2015, winning the title once. He also guided the Western Province Under-21s to five consecutive play-offs between 2010 and 2014, winning two titles and ending as losing finalists on two occasions.

Western Province Currie Cup

In February 2015, Dobson was appointed as the head coach of 's Currie Cup for the 2015 Currie Cup Premier Division, taking over from Allister Coetzee, who departed to Japan to take over at the Kobelco Steelers.

In 2016, Dobson's Western Province finished in top spot of the 2016 Currie Cup qualification series, winning thirteen of their fourteen matches during the competition.

Personal life

Away from the coaching field, Dobson holds a Law Degree, a master's degree in Business Administration and another one in Creative Writing, which he attained at the University of Cape Town. He is the founder of the 365 Media Group and the Rugby365 website. He is also an author and so far published two novels, Year of the Gherkin in 2012 and Year of the Turnip in 2016.

References

South African rugby union coaches
South African rugby union players
Living people
Rugby union hookers
Western Province (rugby union) players
Year of birth missing (living people)